Colette Mathur, a French writer and Indologist, is the president of the EuroIndia Centre, a non governmental organization promoting interaction between various organizations in India and Europe, through networking. She is the Director - South Asia at the World Economic Forum, the Switzerland-based non-profit organization for public-private cooperation.

Born in Brussels, Mathur did her college studies at University of Geneva and worked as a public relations officer in Brussels before joining the World Economic Forum in 1979. She has held several posts at the WEF such as the Member of the Executive Board and as the Director for South Asia and is committee member of the Geneva Asia Society and a founding member of the EuroIndia Centre.India Rising: Emergence of a New World Power, a book Mathur has co-authored with Frank-Jürgen Richter and Tarun Das, details the emergence of India as a world power and analyses the challenges the country faces. The Government of India awarded him the fourth highest civilian honour of the Padma Shri, in 2008, for her contributions to the country.

See also 
 EuroIndia Centre
 World Economic Forum

References

External links

Further reading 
 
 

Recipients of the Padma Shri in public affairs
Year of birth missing (living people)
University of Geneva alumni
Swiss Indologists
Swiss writers
Living people
Writers from Brussels